Route 76C or Highway 76C may refer to:

United States
 Interstate 76 Connector (unsigned)
 Nebraska Spur 76C